Noboru Kousaka (上坂 昇 Kōsaka Noboru, July 6, 1918 – July 2, 2013) was a Japanese politician. He was a member of the House of Representatives of Japan for the Japan Socialist Party from 1973 until his retirement in 1991.

References 

1918 births
2013 deaths
Politicians from Fukushima Prefecture
Waseda University alumni
Social Democratic Party (Japan) politicians
Members of the House of Representatives (Japan)